The Essential George Benson is a compilation album by American jazz musician George Benson, released in 2006 as a double-disc, 21-track career-spanning anthology. It is part of Sony BMG's Essential series of compilation albums.

Reception 

Jazz Times refers to the album as "an extraordinary musician by any standard, Benson comes close to redeeming some horribly dated CTI material, including 'White Rabbit', a landmark in schlock. There are also highlights from other key players-don’t miss Kenny Barron’s Rhodes solo on the 1974 Don Sebesky arrangement of 'Take Five.' Write off the R&B tracks if you must, but they’re flawlessly realized. 'This Masquerade' is a model of pure, economical soul singing. 'On Broadway' appears in a 10-minute live version."

Track listing

Disc one

Disc two

Release history

References 

George Benson albums
2006 compilation albums
Columbia Records compilation albums
Sony Music compilation albums
Legacy Recordings compilation albums